AYY may refer to:

'Ayy, a district in Karak Governorate, Jordan
Aalto University Student Union, Espoo, Finland
Arugam Bay Seaplane Base (IATA: AYY), Pottuvil, Sri Lanka
The code for Ayeyarwady Region in vehicle registration plates of Myanmar
A common prefix for a demi unit load device
ISO 639:ayy, a spurious ISO 639-3 code for the purported Tayabas Ayta language